Bekmurzino (Bikmırźa) is a rural locality (a selo) in Staropetrovsky Selsoviet, Birsky District, Bashkortostan, Russia. The population was 391 as of 2010. There are 5 streets.

Geography 
Bekmurzino is located 25 km south of Birsk (the district's administrative centre) by road. Novopetrovo is the nearest rural locality.

References 

Rural localities in Birsky District